The Bellaire Bridge or Interstate Bridge is a privately owned, closed cantilever truss toll bridge that spans the Ohio River between Benwood, West Virginia (near Wheeling) and Bellaire, Ohio (near Martins Ferry). It provided a link for commuters between southern Ohio border towns and West Virginia steel mills from 1926 to 1991.

Built in 1926, the bridge is likely the oldest cantilever truss bridge in West Virginia, and is the second oldest vehicular truss bridge over the entire Ohio River. It is currently unused, and missing approach spans on the Ohio side. , the bridge remains standing, with status regarding demolition unknown.

Construction 
The bridge was designed as a cantilever truss bridge by J. E. Greiner Company, with the Vang Construction Company as contractors of the substructure; the J.E. Moss Iron Works and the Mt. Vernon Bridge Company as co-contractors of the superstructure.  The R. R. Kitchen company of Wheeling had charge of placing the floor in the bridge.

The bridge was constructed over 18 months starting in June 1925 at a cost of about $1.5 million, which is equivalent to $ in present-day terms.  Funds were raised primarily through subscription by local residents.  During construction, hundreds worked on the bridge, and one worker was killed: Fred Morning fell from a pier on the Benwood, West Virginia side to the ground below on June 12, 1926.

Over seven million tons of structural steel was used in the construction of the bridge.  Railroad track for streetcars was laid in the bridge deck, but never saw use.  The bridge opened to traffic on December 22, 1926, with over 7,000 vehicles crossing it on its opening day.

Tolls 
In order to cover the cost of construction, those crossing the bridge were charged a toll.  Initially, a one-way trip cost 5 cents.  For nearly 45 years, the toll remained unchanged until, in 1971, the toll was increased to 25 cents one-way, 40 cents round trip.  The bridge began losing money in 1984, so the owners increased the toll once more to 50 cents one-way, one dollar round trip. The opening of the Vietnam Veterans Memorial Bridge, along with another bridge in nearby Moundsville was thought to have reduced the amount of traffic, and thus tolls collected by the Bellaire Bridge by up to 50 per-cent in 1987.

Closure and planned demolition
This bridge was closed to traffic on May 1, 1991 because the Ohio Department of Transportation (ODOT) needed to demolish the approach ramp to the crossing on the Ohio side of the river in order to provide right-of-way for a relocated Ohio State Route 7, which would no longer service the bridge.

ODOT paid $2.1 million in November 1990 to the Interstate Bridge Company, the bridge's owner, and demolished the ramp soon after its closure. The U.S. Route 250 and West Virginia Route 2 approaches on the West Virginia side were concurrently abandoned.

The bridge was sold to Roger Barack, owner of a construction company in Bellaire, in March 1991. There were talks of building a new approach on the Ohio side, however, no action was ever taken. $895,000 of the Ohio Department of Transportation payment had been set aside for demolition of the bridge but no demolition came about.

With assistance from then-state Senator Bob Ney, Barack approached ODOT about reopening the bridge, but those plans never bore fruit because "the costs involved far outweighed any potential for the bridge to function economically," according to a 2003 letter from ODOT Deputy Director Randall F. Howard.

In 2002, Benwood, West Virginia officials requested that the bridge be demolished as football-sized debris was falling onto the roadway below, but nothing was done.  The United States Coast Guard had ordered the span demolished, and had fined Barack over $200,000 for his nonfeasance.  The bridge was still in place in May 2005, The Plain Dealer describing it as "a decrepit nuisance that residents of both states are eager to demolish."

Bob Ney controversy 
Bob Ney, who had become a member of the  U.S. House of Representatives, obtained a $1.7 million Federal grant in 2005 to fund demolition the bridge.  This soon engendered controversy, due to Ney's preexisting personal and political ties to Barack.  Before Bellaire switched from Ney's district to that of Ted Strickland as a result of Congressional redistricting driven by the results of the 2000 United States Census, Ney rented his Congressional office space from Barack for $1,800 a month.  Ney also received campaign contributions of $6,000 from Barack and his wife, most recently in 1997. Along with this, Ney nominated Barack's son for appointment to the United States Air Force Academy.

Demolition 
On May 20, 2010, Roger Barack announced that he had sold the bridge to Advanced Explosives Demolition (AED), a demolition company that has gained fame through their demolitions on the TLC reality show The Imploders, for USD 1. AED then sold the bridge to KDC Investments for USD 25,000, finalizing the deal on June 3, 2010.  AED will be subcontracted to complete the demolition, with Delta Demolition, a local company, serving as the general contractor.  The project originally was to be completed by September 28, 2010, but as has been historically typical with the bridge, delays have pushed the demolition back from a target of June 2011 to being indefinitely placed on hold. The current delay stems from disagreement between the contractor and Benwood, West Virginia officials over an escrow account being created to ensure demolition is completed once started. A Federal Court has ordered that the escrow account be in place by June 20, 2013, and the bridge be demolished within 8 months of the formation of the escrow account. The contractor faces a USD $1,000 per day fine for not meeting these conditions.

Three companies have placed liens against the bridge claiming scrap rights, with at least two of those companies claiming they paid for exclusive scrapping rights. The next trial date is set for November 12, 2013. 
As of 2021, the bridge remains standing and the dispute is ongoing.

Notable events 
On Independence Day, 4 July 1927, an interstate wedding took place on the span between Wheeling, West Virginia resident Roberta Pearl Thomas of, and Harry E. Stricklin of Bellaire, Ohio.  It is not known whether the bride or groom paid the toll.
Portions of the movie The Silence of the Lambs were filmed on the bridge.

See also 
List of crossings of the Ohio River

References

Sources
 Martins Ferry Daily Times (Martins Ferry, Ohio). December 22, 1926.
 Martins Ferry Daily Times (Martins Ferry, Ohio). July 1, 1927.
 The Intelligencer (Wheeling, West Virginia). December 1, 1990.
 The Intelligencer (Wheeling, West Virginia). March 27, 1991.
 The Wheeling News Register - Ohio Edition (Wheeling, West Virginia). April 22, 1991.
 Letter from the Interstate Bridge Company (Bellaire, Ohio). March 27, 1948.

External links
 Bellaire Interstate Toll Bridge at Bridges & Tunnels
 Bellaire Bridge at Historic Bridges of Michigan and Elsewhere
 Bellaire Toll Bridge at Bridgehunter.com Bellaire Toll Bridge

Bridges over the Ohio River
Bridges completed in 1926
Former toll bridges in West Virginia
Former toll bridges in Ohio
Bridges in Appalachian Ohio
Buildings and structures in Marshall County, West Virginia
Bridges in Belmont County, Ohio
Transportation in Marshall County, West Virginia
Road bridges in Ohio
Road bridges in West Virginia
1926 establishments in the United States
Cantilever bridges in the United States
Steel bridges in the United States